KooKoo is a Finnish ice hockey team playing in the first level of Finnish ice hockey league Liiga. KooKoo plays in the Lumon arena (capacity 5,950), in Kouvola.  The team was established in 1965 and the previous name of the club is Kouvolan Kiekko-65.

Franchise history 
KooKoo was established by the Kouvolan Pallonlyöjät and Sudet in Kouvola on 3 November 1965. The first official match was played on November 17, 1965 when KooKoo won the Kuusankoski Puhti goals 4–2. A new club for ice hockey skills got plenty from Lappeenranta, where many of its first-year players and coaches came from.

Early years
KooKoo started its career in the official series of the Association in the 1966–1967 season, when it participated in the Southern Finland division of Maakuntasarja. During the 1967–1968 season, KooKoo played in the Greater Savo division of Maakuntasarja, where it ranked fourth. In the 1969–1970 season, KooKoo ranked second in the Kymenlaakso division and reached the Suomensarja qualifier but wasn't promoted.

Time in the I Division
KooKoo rise to the second highest level in the series, the Suomensarja for the season 1971–1972. It was also included in the 1974 newly created series, the I Division. In 1982, an ice rink was built in Kouvola, which greatly improved the operating conditions. The first match in November 1982 between KooKoo and SaPKo ended in KooKoo's 7–4 victory in front of over 4,000 spectators. KooKoo was able to attempt qualifying to SM-liiga for the first time in the 1984–1985 season, after ranking third in the season. However, KooKoo didn't make it. During the 1985–1986 season, KooKoo was coached by Reino Ruotsalainen, and was ranked third in the regular season. In the four-team league qualifying, Kookoo also ranked third and was forced to continue in the I Division. In the 1986–1987 season, the club celebrated its first league victory after winning the division's regular season before TuTo Hockey.

Time in SM-Liiga
KooKoo's first season in the SM-Liiga was difficult.  In the spring of 1988, KooKoo played a very tight five-game relegation series with  Lahden Kiekkoreipas. The fourth game extended to the overtime until Lasse Tasala settled the match to KooKoo. After that, KooKoo easily retained its place in the crucial fifth match played at home.

In their second season, KooKoo played in the 1988–1989 season with Urpo Ylönen. The team reached its best results as ninth of the league.

The team's last season in the league was very weak and it was relegated back to the first division after losing to the qualifying round for Hockey Reipas.

Back to Division and Fall in Division II
KooKoo started the 1990s in the first division. KooKoo was relegated in 1997 when the first division team was downsized by four. The unambiguous aim of the club was to get back to the first division. The team survived until qualifying, but Hyvinkää Ahmat was better off with 3–2.

Back to Division and Mestis

In the 1998–1999 season, KooKoo came out again in qualifying. It succeeded in winning the Uudenkaupungin Jää-Kotkat in the matches 3-2 and was promoted to the first division after the two-year absence.

In 2000, the team moved to the newly established Mestis. In the spring of 2005, the club announced that it would close down the representation team, but the team with new organization. In 2009–2010 season, KooKoo won the Mestis Regular Series for the first time in 23 years. At the end of the season KooKoo reached bronze medals by winning LeKi 4–2. In the season 2013–2014, KooKoo won Jukurit in finals.

Return to the SM-Liiga
In October 2014, information about KooKoo return to the SM-Liiga for the 2015-2016 season was published.

At the 2017–2018 season, KooKoo made history in the SM-Liiga by leading the series for the first time. At the time, there were 15 teams who had reached the top spot in the regular season.

KooKoo made the 2019–2020 season Kouvola's hockey history for the first time making to the league playoffs. However, the playoffs were not played during the season due to the Coronavirus pandemic. In 2020–2021 season KooKoo reached playoffs Wild-card round against Ilves. KooKoo's season ended in 9th place and Ilves advanced to the quarterfinals.

At the 2021–2022 season, KooKoo advanced for the third time to the playoffs, in Wild-card round ended up against a familiar local opponent Lahti Pelicans. KooKoo's season continued after defeating Pelicans with a total score of 2-1 after two games and KooKoo advanced to the quarterfinals against old Mestis rival Jukurit.

Current roster

Captains

Honours

Champions

 Mestis (1): 2013-14
 I-Divisioona (1): 1986-87 
 Maakuntasarja (II-Divisioona) (1): 1972

Runners-up
 Mestis (3): 2001-02, 2012-13, 2014-15
 I-Divisioona (Fazer-liiga) (1): 1994–95
 Mestis (3): 2002-03, 2009-10, 2011-12
 I-Divisioona (5): 1982–83, 1984–85, 1985–86, 1991–92, 1992–93

Other awards for the club:
Imatra Bauer Tournament winner (1): 2016
Vaasa Cup winner (1): 2013
Tampere Cup winner (1): 2021

Ranking in the SM-Liiga
 1987–88 – 10. 
 1988–89 – 9.
 1989–90 – 11.
 2015–16 – 11.
 2016-17 – 13.
 2017–18 – 14.
 2018–19 - 13.
 2019–20  - 5.
 2020–21  - 9.
 2021–22  - 4.
 2022–23  -

NHL alumni
  Mika Alatalo
  Hannu Kamppuri
  Marko Kiprusoff
  Jarno Kultanen
  Anssi Melametsä
  Jarmo Myllys
  Joni Ortio
  Petri Varis
  Brett Carson
  Josh Green
  Leland Irving
  Christian Thomas
  Gary Yaremchuk
  Jim Leavins
  Steve Peters
  Matt Watkins
  Tommy Wingels
  Niklas Treutle
  Libor Šulák

Other former notable players
  /  Viktor Tyumenev
  /  Siim Liivik
  /  Frederic Cloutier
  Reino Soijärvi
  Malte Strömwall
  Timo Susi
  Ari Vallin
  Juha-Pekka Haataja

Retired numbers

References

External links
Official website (Finnish)

Mestis teams
Kouvola
1965 establishments in Finland
Liiga
Liiga teams